Keith G. Kautz (born 1953) is an American lawyer and judge, who is an associate justice of the Wyoming Supreme Court. He previously served as a Wyoming District Court judge from 1993 to 2015.

Education and early career
Kautz grew up on farms near Lyman, Nebraska, and Huntley, Wyoming, and graduated from Torrington High School in Torrington, Wyoming. He completed a Bachelor of Science degree at the University of Wyoming in 1975, and a J.D. degree at University of Wyoming College of Law in 1978.

Kautz was in private practice in Wyoming from 1978 to 1993. He was an associate attorney with the law firm Sawyer & Warren, and then a partner in the firm Sawyer, Warren & Kautz, in Torrington.

The Governor of Wyoming Mike Sullivan appointed Kautz as a state judge in 1993, serving on the Wyoming District Courts for the Eighth District, which covers four counties: Converse, Goshen, Niobrara, and Platte. Kautz was retained by voters in 1994, 2000, 2006, and 2012. Kautz's father-in-law John Callahan, and grandfather-in-law, also served as Wyoming district court judges.

Supreme Court
In 2012, Michael Golden retired from the Wyoming Supreme Court, and the Wyoming Judicial Nominating Commission put forward Kautz as one of three possible replacements. However, the Governor of Wyoming Matt Mead did not choose Kautz, appointing Michael K. Davis instead.

In March 2015, Wyoming Supreme Court justice Marilyn S. Kite announced that she would retire on August 3. The Wyoming Judicial Nominating Commission again selected Kautz as one of the possible candidates for the Supreme Court, along with attorney Robert W. Tiedeken and Tom Lubnau, the former Speaker of the Wyoming House of Representatives. Governor Mead announced Kautz as his choice to replace Kite on June 5, 2015.

Kautz was sworn in as a justice of the Wyoming Supreme Court on August 4, 2015. He won a retention election to complete the rest of Kite's term in November 2016, winning 77% of the vote. His current term on the court expires on January 6, 2019, and he is eligible to run for re-election to a new eight-year term in November 2018.

References

1953 births
Living people
Justices of the Wyoming Supreme Court
University of Wyoming alumni
University of Wyoming College of Law alumni
Wyoming state court judges
People from Scotts Bluff County, Nebraska
21st-century American judges